The term black and white village refers to several old English villages, typically in the county of Herefordshire, West Midlands of England.

The term "black and white" derives from presence of many timbered and half-timbered houses in the area, some dating from medieval times.  The buildings' black oak beams are exposed on the outside, with white painted walls between. The numbers of houses surviving in this style in the villages creates a very distinctive impression and differs from building styles outside this area.

It was probably only during the late Victorian age that it became fashionable to finish the buildings in a black and white veneer. In earlier times, the oak would not have been stained, but retained its natural colour and the walls would have reflected the colour of the local clay, generally a pink colour, rather than a white whitewash lime.

A 40-mile (64 km) circular tourist trail known as the "Black and White Village Trail" was developed in 1987 as a means of encouraging tourists to take a closer look at the Herefordshire villages, heritage and countryside.  The trail was developed mainly for travel by car, but it is also possible to make the journey by bicycle. Many coach tours now take in the trail also.

Locations on the trail
 Dilwyn
 Eardisley
 Kingsland
 Weobley
 Wigmore
 Yarpole
 Lyonshall
 Pembridge
 Eardisland

External links
 The Black & White Village Trail Leominster Country. Leominster Town Council.
 - a celebration of black and white timber-frame buildings in England, including the Black and White Trail and slideshows of Herefordshire villages and others with black and white buildings

Villages in Herefordshire